Alfredo Salomón Ruano Safie (14 October 1932 – 18 July 1987) was a famous football player from El Salvador who played as a forward.

Club career
Ruano was part of the successful Alianza team of the early 1960s when he played alongside Salvador Mariona and Roberto Rivas among others.

International career
Nicknamed Baiza, Alfredo Ruano participated in many tournaments throughout his career with El Salvador, such as the CCCF Championship, CONCACAF Championship, and Central American and Caribbean Games. He played in the 1954 Central American and Caribbean Games winning team alongside other Salvadoran football greats as Juan Francisco Barraza.

Personal life
Alfredo was married to Nora Elizabeth Guerra de Ruano and they had 4 children named Mario Alfredo Ruano Guerra, Ana Maria Ruano Guerra, JuanCarlos Alberto Ruano Guerra, Nora Elizabeth Ruano Guerra. He was the founder and business owner of Baiza Ruano Deportes in San Salvador, El Salvador. Baiza was also the father-in-law of another Salvadoran legend: Mágico González. His grandson [[
Rodrigo Alfredo González Ruano|Rodrigo González]], who is the son of Mágico, later also played for Atlético Marte.

References

External links
 El Salvador en Los Juegos Deportivos Centroamericanos y del Caribe - ElBalónCuscatleco 
 Selecciones Nacionales 1960 - 1969 - ElBalónCuscatleco 

Year of birth unknown
1987 deaths
Association football forwards
Salvadoran footballers
El Salvador international footballers
C.D. Atlético Marte footballers
Alianza F.C. footballers
Salvadoran football managers
C.D. Águila managers
1932 births